The Royal Queensland Golf Club is a golf club and course at the end of Curtin West Avenue, Eagle Farm, Brisbane, Queensland, Australia. Located beside the Brisbane River is a 10-minute drive from the Brisbane CBD. It has hosted the Australian Open three times: in 1947, 1966, and 1973.

History 
The Royal Queensland Golf Club was founded in 1920, initially as the Queensland Golf Club. The original course was designed by Carnegie Clark, the Australian Open Champion, and was opened by the Governor-General Lord Forster in 1921. King George V gave the club its Royal Charter in 1921; the King's official letter of notification to the Governor of Queensland was signed by Winston Churchill (then British Secretary of State). Construction of the new Championship course was completed in December 2007. In 2005, the Queensland Government decided to build a second Gateway Bridge over the Brisbane River, which impacted on the original course. The new Royal Queensland layout was designed by Mike Clayton.

Geography
The course is on the northern bank of the Brisbane River.  The course is flat with the front 9 working around the grounds in a clockwise fashion and the back 9 inside the front 9. The Gateway Motorway passes alongside the eastern boundary.

Reciprocal Clubs
The Royal Queensland Golf Club has an extensive global and domestic club list.  Clubs include The Australian, Hong Kong, New South Wales, Royal Adelaide, Royal Melbourne and Royal Sydney.

Australian Open

The winners of these three Australian Open's are:
1973 J. C. Snead (USA)
1966 Arnold Palmer (USA)
1947 Ossie Pickworth (AUS)

Notable members
Adam Scott is a current member of the club.

See also
List of golf clubs granted Royal status

References

Further reading

External links
 
Royal Queensland Golf Club Course profile, Golf Australia
Queensland Golf Clubs

1920 establishments in Australia
Sports venues completed in 1920
Golf clubs and courses in Queensland
Sporting clubs in Brisbane
Sports venues in Brisbane
Eagle Farm, Queensland
Organisations based in Australia with royal patronage
Venues of the 2032 Summer Olympics and Paralympics
Royal golf clubs